Virbia medarda is a moth in the family Erebidae. It was described by Caspar Stoll in 1781. It is found in Suriname, Guatemala, Panama and Venezuela.

References

Moths described in 1781
medarda